The Nigerian National League (formerly known as National Division 1) is the second tier of club football in Nigeria.

History 
From 1997-2011, the league has been split into 1A for Northern teams and 1B for southern teams. The top two from each division are promoted to the Nigerian Premier League the next season. The exceptions were the 2005–06 and 2006-07 seasons where there were four divisions of eight teams each, with each division winner winning promotion. Up to four teams in each division are relegated each season to the Amateur First Division. The league was renamed 19 June 2008. In 2012 the league expanded from 32 to 36 teams with 2 more teams promoted. The league used the 2006 format, with four divisions of nine teams each, with division winners receiving automatic promotion. In 2012-13, it went back to two divisions of sixteen. For the 2015 season, it used four divisions of eight teams.

2020-21 season
On 6 November 2020, the league's organizing committee agreed to continue the four division North and South format for the 2021 season. The start date was to be three weeks after the top division NPFL resumes. The league is expected to start on 30 January 2021 after the successful draws at the Congress held on Friday 15 January at Ebonyi State

On Saturday 30 January 2021, an Emergency congress took place in Ebonyi State where the kick off date was changed to 13 February 2021. 21 clubs voted in favor of 13 February while 4 clubs voted in favor of 6 February 

Group A1
Aklosendi International, Lafia
EFCC FC, Abuja
El-Kanemi Warriors F.C., Maiduguri
Gombe United F.C.
Green Berets of Zaria
Mighty Jets of Jos
NAF FC
Oyah Sports International, Minna
Rarara FC, Katsina
Sokoto United F.C.
FC Taraba
Group A2
ABS F.C., Ilorin
DMD Borno
Federal Road Safety FC
G&K Shekarau FC, Kano
Kebbi United
Kogi United
Malumfashi United
Niger Tornadoes, Minna
Yobe Desert Stars F.C.
Zamfara United

Group B1
Calabar Rovers
Delta Force F.C.
Dynamite Force FC, Benin 
Ekiti United
Giant Brillars, Enugu
Go Round F.C., Omoku
Nilàyo FC, Abeokuta
Nnewi United
Osun United F.C.
3SC, Ibadan
Stationery Stores F.C., Lagos
Vandrezzer FC, Lagos

Group B2
Abia Comets F.C.
Apex Krane FC, Delta State
Bayelsa United
Bendel Insurance
Crown F.C. 
Gateway United F.C.
Godosky FC, Anambra
Holy Arrows FC, Oleh
Ibom Youths FC, Uyo
J'Atete FC, Ughelli
Joy Cometh FC, Lagos
FC One Rocket, Ikot Ekpene
Remo Stars F.C.

Nigeria National League Stadiums 2020-21

2019-20 season
The season kicked off in November 2019. The 42 teams were consolidated back into four divisions.

The league went for the December break, and didn't return. The league was later cancelled due to the outbreak of Covid-19 outbreak in Nigeria. No team was promoted to the Premier division after football activities were stopped due to the rampaging effect of Covid-19. 

Group A1

ABS F.C.
Aklosendi Int'l
DMD Borno
Federal Road Safety FC 
Green Beret 
Kada City F.C.
Kebbi United 
Kogi United
NAF FC 
Malumfashi FC 
Oyah Sports 
FC Zamfara

Group A2
EFCC F.C. 
El-Kanemi Warriors 
Gombe United
Kwara United
Mighty Jets 
Rarara FC 
Sokoto United
Niger Tornadoes
Yobe Desert Stars

Group B1
Abia Comets 
Apex Krane FC, Delta State 
Ibom Youth
Dynamite FC 
Ekiti United
Gateway United F.C.
 Giant Brillars 
Go Round F.C. 
Nilàyo FC 
Osun United F.C.
Shooting Stars S.C.

Group B2
Bayelsa United 
Bendel Insurance
Calabar Rovers
Crown F.C. 
J'Atete FC 
Joy Cometh FC 
Lamray United 
Remo Stars F.C.
Stationery Stores F.C.
Vandrezzer FC

Past winners
The league was a single table until 1998. Between 1998-2011 winners of the North and South divisions played a one-game playoff to determine the overall Division champion. 2011-2017 the champion was determined by a Super Four mini-league between the four promoted teams. In 2018 it was a Super Eight to pick the four teams.

See also
List of Nigerian Clubs

References

External links
 2006-07 season on rsssf
 2009-10 final 1-A table (JUTH FC site)
 Two clubs opt out of NNL
 National League hits TV
 Nigeria National League holds Seminar 
 2012 league lineup

 
2
Second level football leagues in Africa
Sports leagues established in 1979
1979 establishments in Nigeria